The compositions of Ludwig van Beethoven consist of 722 works written over forty-five years, from his earliest work in 1782 (variations for piano on a march by Ernst Christoph Dressler) when he was only eleven years old and still in Bonn, until his last work just before his death in Vienna in 1827. Beethoven composed works in all the main genres of classical music, including symphonies, concertos, string quartets, piano sonatas and opera. His compositions range from solo works to those requiring a large orchestra and chorus.

Beethoven straddled both the Classical and Romantic periods, working in genres associated with Wolfgang Amadeus Mozart and his teacher Joseph Haydn, such as the piano concerto, string quartet and symphony, while on the other hand providing the groundwork for other Romantic composers, such as Hector Berlioz and Franz Liszt, with programmatic works such as his Pastoral Symphony and Piano Sonata "Les Adieux". Beethoven's work is typically divided into three periods: the "Early" period, where he composed in the "Viennese" style; the "Middle" or "Heroic" period, where his work is characterised by struggle and heroism, such as in the Eroica Symphony, the Fifth Symphony, the Appassionata Sonata and in his sole opera Fidelio; and the "Late" period, marked by intense personal expression and an emotional and intellectual profundity. Although his output greatly diminished in his later years, this period saw the composition of masterpieces such as the late string quartets, the final five piano sonatas, the Diabelli Variations, the Missa Solemnis and the Ninth Symphony.

Beethoven's works are classified by both genre and various numbering systems. The best-known numbering system for Beethoven's works is that by opus number, assigned by Beethoven's publishers during his lifetime. Only 172 of Beethoven's works have opus numbers, divided among 138 opus numbers. Many works that were unpublished or published without opus numbers have been assigned one of "WoO" (Werke ohne Opuszahl—works without opus number), Hess or Biamonti numbers. For example, the short piano piece "Für Elise" is more fully known as the "Bagatelle in A minor, WoO 59 ('Für Elise')". Some works are also commonly referred to by their nicknames, such as the Kreutzer Violin Sonata, or the Archduke Piano Trio.

Works are also often identified by their number within their genre. For example, the 14th string quartet, published as Opus 131, may be referenced either as "String Quartet No. 14" or "the Opus 131 String Quartet". The listings below include all of these relevant identifiers. While other catalogues of Beethoven's works exist, the numbers here represent the most commonly used.

List of works by genre

Beethoven's works are published in several editions, the first of these was Ludwig van Beethovens Werke: Vollständige kritisch durchgesehene überall berechtigte Ausgabe published between 1862 and 1865 with a supplemental volume in 1888 by Breitkopf & Härtel, commonly known as the "Beethoven Gesamtausgabe" [GA]. While this was a landmark achievement at the time, the limitations of this edition soon became apparent. Between 1959 and 1971 Willy Hess prepared a supplemental edition, Beethoven: Sämtliche Werke: Supplemente zur Gesamtausgabe, [HS] containing works that were not in the Gesamtausgabe.

Since 1961 the Beethoven Archive has been publishing a new scholarly–critical Complete Edition of Beethoven's works, Beethoven: Werke: neue Ausgabe sämtlicher Werke [NA]. However, only 42 of the projected 56 volumes have been published so far. As this edition has not been published in full there are works without an NA designation.

Legend for publications – p: parts s: full score vs: vocal score

Orchestral music
Beethoven wrote nine symphonies, several concertos, and a variety of other orchestral music, ranging from overtures and incidental music for theatrical productions to other miscellaneous "occasional" works, written for a particular occasion. Of the concertos, seven are widely known (one violin concerto, five piano concertos, and one triple concerto for violin, piano, and cello); the other two are an early piano concerto (WoO 4) and an arrangement of the Violin Concerto for piano and orchestra (Opus 61a).

Symphonies

Beethoven is believed to have intended to write a Tenth Symphony in the last year of his life; a performing version of possible sketches was assembled by Barry Cooper.

Concertos

Other works for soloist and orchestra

Overtures and incidental music

Chamber music
Beethoven wrote 16 string quartets and numerous other forms of chamber music, including piano trios, string trios, and sonatas for violin and cello with piano, as well as works with wind instruments.

Chamber music for strings

String quartets

Other chamber music for strings

Chamber music with piano

Solo instrument and piano

Piano Trios

Other chamber music with piano

Chamber music for winds

Solo piano music
In addition to the 32 celebrated sonatas, Beethoven's work for solo piano includes many one-movement pieces, more than twenty sets of variations, most unpublished in his lifetime or published without opus number, and over thirty bagatelles, including the well-known "Für Elise".

Piano sonatas

Piano variations

Shorter piano pieces

Piano four hands

Vocal music
While he completed only one opera, Beethoven wrote vocal music throughout his life, including two Mass settings, other works for chorus and orchestra (in addition to the Ninth Symphony), arias, duets, art songs (lieder), and true song cycles.

Operas

Choral works with orchestra

Other choral works

Solo voices and orchestra

Songs

Folksongs

Wind Band

Collections of dances

Canons and musical jokes

Miscellaneous

List of works by Beethoven
The following is a list of Beethoven's works, sorted by Opus number, followed by works listed as WoO in the Kinsky–Halm Catalogue, and then works listed in the appendix of that catalogue, which are given "Anhang" numbers. These are followed by additional works with Hess numbers listed in the catalogue of Willy Hess that are not otherwise listed in the Kinsky–Halm Catalogue. Lastly there are works with Biamonti numbers (Bia.), from the Biamonti Catalogue, an attempt to catalogue everything that Beethoven wrote in chronological order, though there are works that were not known at the time it was compiled. Thus there is no definitive catalogue of Beethoven's works to match the Deutsch catalogue for Schubert or the Köchel catalogue for Mozart.

Works with opus numbers
The opus numbers were assigned by publishers to Beethoven's works as they were published. The opus numbers do not include all works that were published in Beethoven's lifetime nor are they in chronological order. For instance, the Octet Op. 103 was written before November 1792, while Op. 102 and Op. 104 were written in 1815 and 1817 respectively.
Op. 1: Three Piano Trios (1795)
No. 1: Piano Trio No. 1 in E major
No. 2: Piano Trio No. 2 in G major
No. 3: Piano Trio No. 3 in C minor
Op. 2: Three Piano Sonatas (1796)
No. 1: Piano Sonata No. 1 in F minor
No. 2: Piano Sonata No. 2 in A major
No. 3: Piano Sonata No. 3 in C major
Op. 3: String Trio No. 1 in E major (1794)
Op. 4: String Quintet (Reworking of Wind Octet (Op. 103), 1795)
Op. 5: Two Cello Sonatas (1796)
No. 1: Cello Sonata No. 1 in F major
No. 2: Cello Sonata No. 2 in G minor
Op. 6: Sonata for Piano, Four Hands in D major (1797)
Op. 7: Piano Sonata No. 4 in E major (1797)
Op. 8: String Trio No. 2 (Serenade) in D major (1797)
Op. 9: Three String Trios (1798)
No. 1: String Trio No. 3 in G major
No. 2: String Trio No. 4 in D major
No. 3: String Trio No. 5 in C minor
Op. 10: Three Piano Sonatas (1798)
No. 1: Piano Sonata No. 5 in C minor
No. 2: Piano Sonata No. 6 in F major
No. 3: Piano Sonata No. 7 in D major
Op. 11: Piano Trio No. 4 in B major ("Gassenhauer") (1797) (for clarinet (or violin), cello (sometimes bassoon), and piano)
Op. 12: Three Violin Sonatas (1798)
No. 1: Violin Sonata No. 1 in D major
No. 2: Violin Sonata No. 2 in A major
No. 3: Violin Sonata No. 3 in E major
Op. 13: Piano Sonata No. 8 in C minor ("Pathetique") (1799)
Op. 14: Two Piano Sonatas (1799)
No. 1: Piano Sonata No. 9 in E major (arranged for String Quartet by the composer in F major, H 34, in 1801)
No. 2: Piano Sonata No. 10 in G major
Op. 15: Piano Concerto No. 1 in C major (1795)
Op. 16: Quintet for Piano and Winds (1796) (later arranged for piano quartet)
Op. 17: Horn Sonata in F major (1800)
Op. 18: Six String Quartets (1800)
No. 1: String Quartet No. 1 in F major
No. 2: String Quartet No. 2 in G major
No. 3: String Quartet No. 3 in D major
No. 4: String Quartet No. 4 in C minor
No. 5: String Quartet No. 5 in A major
No. 6: String Quartet No. 6 in B major
Op. 19: Piano Concerto No. 2 in B major (1795)
Op. 20: Septet in E major (1799)
Op. 21: Symphony No. 1 in C major (1800)
Op. 22: Piano Sonata No. 11 in B major (1800)
Op. 23: Violin Sonata No. 4 in A minor (1801)
Op. 24: Violin Sonata No. 5 in F major ("Spring") (1801)
Op. 25: Serenade for Flute, Violin and Viola in D major (1801)
Op. 26: Piano Sonata No. 12 in A major (1801)
Op. 27: Two Piano Sonatas (1801)
No. 1: Piano Sonata No. 13 in E major
No. 2: Piano Sonata No. 14 in C minor ("Moonlight")
Op. 28: Piano Sonata No. 15 in D major ("Pastoral") (1801)
Op. 29: String Quintet in C major (1801)
Op. 30: Three Violin Sonatas (1802)
No. 1: Violin Sonata No. 6 in A major
No. 2: Violin Sonata No. 7 in C minor
No. 3: Violin Sonata No. 8 in G major
Op. 31: Three Piano Sonatas (1802)
No. 1: Piano Sonata No. 16 in G major
No. 2: Piano Sonata No. 17 in D minor ("Tempest")
No. 3: Piano Sonata No. 18 in E major ("Hunt")
Op. 32: Song "An die Hoffnung" (1805)
Op. 33: Seven Bagatelles for piano (1802)
Op. 34: Six variations on an original theme for piano in F major (1802)
Op. 35: Fifteen variations and a fugue for piano on an original theme in E major ("Eroica Variations") (1802)
Op. 36: Symphony No. 2 in D major (1802)
Op. 37: Piano Concerto No. 3 in C minor (1800)
Op. 38: Piano Trio in E major (arrangement of the Septet, Opus 20) (1803) (for clarinet (or violin), cello, and piano)
Op. 39: Two Preludes through all twelve major keys for piano (1789)
Op. 40: Romance for Violin and Orchestra No. 1 in G major (1802)
Op. 41: Serenade for Piano and Flute (or Violin) in D major (1803) (Arrangement of Op. 25 Serenade for Flute, Violin and Viola)
Op. 42: Notturno for Viola and Piano in D major (1803) (Arrangement of Opus 8 Serenade for Violin, Viola and Cello)
Op. 43: The Creatures of Prometheus, overture and ballet music (1801)
Op. 44: Variations on an original theme in E major for piano trio (1792)
Op. 45: Three Marches for Piano, 4 hands (1803)
Op. 46: Song – "Adelaide" (1795)
Op. 47: Violin Sonata No. 9 in A major ("Kreutzer") (1803)
Op. 48: Six Songs (1802)
Op. 49: Two Piano Sonatas (between 1795 and 1798)
No. 1: Piano Sonata No. 19 in G minor
No. 2: Piano Sonata No. 20 in G major
Op. 50: Romance for Violin and Orchestra No. 2 in F major (1798)
Op. 51: Two Rondos for Piano (1797)
No. 1: Rondo in C major
No. 2: Rondo in G major
Op. 52: Eight Songs (1804–1805)
Op. 53: Piano Sonata No. 21 in C major ("Waldstein") (1803)
Op. 54: Piano Sonata No. 22 in F major (1804)
Op. 55: Symphony No. 3 in E major ("Eroica") (1805)
Op. 56: Triple Concerto for violin, cello, and piano in C major (1804–1805)
Op. 57: Piano Sonata No. 23 in F minor ("Appassionata") (1805–1806)
Op. 58: Piano Concerto No. 4 in G major (1805–1806)
Op. 59: Three String Quartets ("Rasumovsky") (1806)
No. 1: String Quartet No. 7 in F major
No. 2: String Quartet No. 8 in E minor
No. 3: String Quartet No. 9 in C major
Op. 60: Symphony No. 4 in B major (1806)
Op. 61: Violin Concerto in D major (1806)
Op. 61a: Piano Transcription of Violin Concerto, Opus 61
Op. 62: Coriolan Overture (1807)
Op. 63: Arrangement of String Quintet (Opus 4) for Piano Trio (1806) (doubtful)
Op. 64: Arrangement of String Trio (Opus 3) for Piano and Cello (1807) (spurious – author unknown)
Op. 65: Aria: "" (1796)
Op. 66: 12 Variations for cello and piano in F major on "Ein Mädchen oder Weibchen" from Mozart's The Magic Flute (1796)
Op. 67: Symphony No. 5 in C minor (1807–1808)
Op. 68: Symphony No. 6 in F major ("Pastoral") (1807–1808)
Op. 69: Cello Sonata No. 3 in A major (1808)
Op. 70: Two Piano Trios (1808)
No. 1: Piano Trio No. 5 in D major ("Ghost")
No. 2: Piano Trio No. 6 in E major

Op. 71: Wind sextet in E (1796)
Op. 72: Fidelio, opera (c. 1803–05; Fidelio Overture composed 1814)
Op. 72a: Leonore (earlier version of Fidelio, with Leonore Overture No. 2) (1805)
Op. 72b: Leonore (earlier version of Fidelio, with Leonore Overture No. 3) (1806)
Op. 73: Piano Concerto No. 5 in E major ("Emperor") (1809)
Op. 74: String Quartet No. 10 in E major ("Harp") (1809)
Op. 75: Six Songs (1809)
Op. 76: Six variations on an original theme for piano in D major (includes the Turkish March from The Ruins of Athens) (1809)
Op. 77: Piano Fantasia in G minor (1809)
Op. 78: Piano Sonata No. 24 in F major (1809)
Op. 79: Piano Sonata No. 25 in G major (1809)
Op. 80: "Choral Fantasy" (Fantasia in C minor for piano, chorus, and orchestra) (1808)
Op. 81a: Piano Sonata No. 26 in E major ("Les Adieux") (1809)
Op. 81b: Sextet in E major (1795)
Op. 82: Four Ariettas and a Duet (1809)
Op. 83: Three Songs (1810)
Op. 84: Egmont, overture and incidental music (1810)
Op. 85: Oratorio: Christus am Ölberge (Christ on the Mount of Olives) (1803)
Op. 86: Mass in C major (1807)
Op. 87: Trio for two Oboes and English Horn in C major (1795)
Op. 88: Song: "Das Glück der Freundschaft" (1803)
Op. 89: Polonaise in C major (1814)
Op. 90: Piano Sonata No. 27 in E minor (1814)
Op. 91: Wellington's Victory ("Battle Symphony") (1813)
Op. 92: Symphony No. 7 in A major (1812)
Op. 93: Symphony No. 8 in F major (1812)
Op. 94: Song "An die Hoffnung" (1814)
Op. 95: String Quartet No. 11 in F minor ("Serioso") (1810)
Op. 96: Violin Sonata No. 10 in G major (1812)
Op. 97: Piano Trio No. 7 in B major ("Archduke") (1811)
Op. 98: An die ferne Geliebte, song cycle (1816)
Op. 99: Song "Der Mann von Wort" (1816)
Op. 100: Song "Merkenstein" (1814, about the Merkenstein ruins)
Op. 101: Piano Sonata No. 28 in A major (1816)
Op. 102: Two Cello Sonatas (1815)
No. 1: Cello Sonata No. 4 in C major
No. 2: Cello Sonata No. 5 in D major.
Op. 103: Octet in E (1792)
Op. 104: String Quintet (arrangement of Piano Trio No. 3, 1817)
Op. 105: Six National Airs with Variations for Flute (or Violin) and Piano (1819)
Op. 106: Piano Sonata No. 29 in B major ("Hammerklavier") (1818)
Op. 107: Ten National Airs with Variations for Flute (or Violin) and Piano (1820)
Op. 108: Twenty-Five Scottish Songs (1818)
Op. 109: Piano Sonata No. 30 in E major (1820)
Op. 110: Piano Sonata No. 31 in A major (1821)
Op. 111: Piano Sonata No. 32 in C minor (1822)
Op. 112: Meeresstille und glückliche Fahrt (Calm Sea and Prosperous Voyage), for chorus and orchestra (1815)
Op. 113: Die Ruinen von Athen (The ruins of Athens), overture and incidental music (1811)
Op. 114: March and Chorus for Die Weihe des Hauses (The Consecration of the House) from Die Ruinen von Athen (The ruins of Athens) (1822)
Op. 115: Zur Namensfeier (Feastday), overture (1815)
Op. 116: "Tremate, empi tremate", vocal trio with orchestra (1802)
Op. 117: König Stephan (King Stephen), overture and incidental music (1811)
Op. 118: "Elegischer Gesang" for four voices and string quartet (1814)
Op. 119: Eleven new Bagatelles for piano (1822)
Op. 120: Thirty-three variations on a waltz by Diabelli for piano in C major ("Diabelli Variations") (1823)
Op. 121a: Kakadu Variations, for Piano Trio (Variations on "Ich bin der Schneider Kakadu") (1803)
Op. 121b: "Opferlied" for soprano, chorus and orchestra (1822)
Op. 122: "Bundeslied" for soprano, alto, chorus and wind instruments (1824)
Op. 123: Missa solemnis in D major (1823)
Op. 124: Die Weihe des Hauses (The Consecration of the House), overture and incidental music (1822)
Op. 125: Symphony No. 9 in D minor ("Choral") (1824)
Op. 126: Six Bagatelles for piano (1824)
Op. 127: String Quartet No. 12 in E major (1825)
Op. 128: Song: "Der Kuss" (1822)
Op. 129: Rondo à Capriccio for piano in G major ("Rage over a lost penny") (1795)
Op. 130: String Quartet No. 13 in B major (1825–1826)
Op. 131: String Quartet No. 14 in C minor (1826)
Op. 132: String Quartet No. 15 in A minor (1825)
Op. 133: Große Fuge in B major for string quartet (originally finale of Opus 130) (1825)
Op. 134: Piano arrangement (4 hands) of the Große Fuge, Opus 133 (1826)
Op. 135: String Quartet No. 16 in F major (1826)
Op. 136: Cantata: Der glorreiche Augenblick (1814)
Op. 137: Fugue for String Quintet in D major (1817)
Op. 138: Leonore, opera (earlier version of Fidelio, with Leonore Overture No. 1) (1807)

Works with WoO numbers
The numbers and categories used below are from the Kinsky–Halm Catalogue of 1955. WoO is an abbreviation of "Werke ohne Opuszahl", German for "Works without Opus number". While some of these works were published during Beethoven's lifetime but not given opus numbers, for instance the piano variations WoO 80, others like Für Elise WoO 59 were not published until later. Unlike with opus numbers which were assigned depending on when the works were published, WoO numbers were assigned by genre.

Instrumental works: WoO 1–86

Orchestral works

Orchestra alone
WoO 1: Musik zu einem Ritterballett (Music for a ballet on horseback) (1790–01)
WoO 2a: Triumphal March for orchestra for 's tragedy Tarpeja (1813)
WoO 2b: Introduction to Act II of Leonore (1805)
WoO 3: "Gratulations-Menuett", minuet for orchestra (1822)

Concertante
WoO 4: Piano Concerto No. 0 in E major (solo part only with indications of orchestration) (1784)
WoO 5: Violin Concerto movement in C major, fragment (1790–92)
WoO 6: Rondo in B major for piano and orchestra, possibly part of initial version of the Piano Concerto No. 2 (1793)

Dances
WoO 7: Twelve minuets for orchestra (later arranged for piano, Hess 101) (1795)
WoO 8: Twelve German Dances for orchestra (later arranged for piano, Hess 100) (1795)
WoO 9: Six minuets for two violins and double bass (authenticity not fully confirmed) (?before 1795)
WoO 10: Six minuets for orchestra (original version lost, only an arrangement for piano is extant) (1795)
WoO 11: Seven Ländler for two violins and cello (original version lost, only an arrangement for piano is extant) (1799)
WoO 12: Twelve minuets for orchestra (spurious, actually by Beethoven's brother Carl) (1799)
WoO 13: Twelve German Dances for orchestra (original version lost, only an arrangement for piano is extant) (1792–97)
WoO 14: Twelve contredanses for orchestra (nos. 1-2, 4-5, 7-10, 12, later arranged for piano, Hess 102) (1791–1801)
WoO 15: Six Ländler for two violins and double bass (later arranged for piano) (1802)
WoO 16: Twelve Écossaises for orchestra (fraudulent) (1806)
WoO 17: Eleven "Mödlinger Tänze" for seven instruments (probably spurious) (1819)

Marches and dances for winds

WoO 18: March for Military Band "Für die Böhmische Landwehr" ["For the Bohemian Ward"] (later arranged for piano, Hess 99) (1809)
WoO 19: March for Military Band "Pferdemusik" ["Horse-music"] (1810)
WoO 20: March for Military Band "Zapfenstreich" ["The Tattoo"] (1810)
WoO 21: Polonaise for Military Band (1810)
WoO 22: Écossaise for Military Band (1810)
WoO 23: Écossaise for Military Band (only a piano arrangement by Carl Czerny is extant) (1810)
WoO 24: March for Military Band (1816)

Chamber works

Without piano

WoO 25: Rondo for wind octet (believed to be the original finale of the Octet, opus 103) (1792)
WoO 26: Duo for two flutes (1792)
WoO 27: Three duets for clarinet and bassoon (probably spurious)
WoO 28: Variations for two oboes and English horn on "Là ci darem la mano" from Mozart's opera Don Giovanni (1795)
WoO 29: March for Wind Sextet in B (1797–98)
WoO 30: Three Equale for four trombones (vocal arrangements of these were performed at Beethoven's funeral) (1812)
WoO 31: Fugue for organ (1783)
WoO 32: Duo for viola and cello, "mit zwei obligaten Augengläsern" ("with two obbligato eyeglasses") (1796–97)
WoO 33: Five pieces for mechanical clock (1794–1800)
WoO 34: Duet for two violins (1822)
WoO 35: Canon for two violins (1825)

With piano
WoO 36: Three piano quartets (1785)
WoO 37: Trio for piano, flute, and bassoon in G major (1786)
WoO 38: Piano Trio in E major (Piano Trio No. 8) (1791)
WoO 39: Allegretto for piano trio in B major (1812)
WoO 40: Twelve variations for piano and violin on "Se vuol ballare" from Mozart's The Marriage of Figaro (1792–93)
WoO 41: Rondo for piano and violin in G major (1793–94)
WoO 42: Six German Dances for violin and piano (1796)
WoO 43a: Sonatina for mandolin and piano (1796)
WoO 43b: Adagio for mandolin and piano (1796)
WoO 44a: Sonatina for mandolin and piano (1796)
WoO 44b: Andante and variations for mandolin and piano (1796)
WoO 45: Twelve Variations for cello and piano on "See, the conqu'ring hero comes" from Handel's Judas Maccabaeus (1796)
WoO 46: Seven Variations for cello and piano in E major on "Bei Männern welche Liebe fühlen" from Mozart's The Magic Flute (1801)

Piano works for 2 or 4 hands

Sonatas and single-movement works
WoO 47: Three piano sonatas (E major, F minor, D major) ("Kurfürsten Sonatas") (1783)
WoO 48: Rondo for piano in C major (1783)
WoO 49: Rondo for piano in A major (1783)
WoO 50: Piano Sonatina (?) in F major (1790–92, two movements)
WoO 51: Piano Sonata in C major (1797–98, fragment) completed Ferdinand Ries, 1830
WoO 52: Presto (Bagatelle) for piano in C minor (1795)
WoO 53: Allegretto (Bagatelle) for piano in C minor (1796–97)
WoO 54: Lustig-Traurig (Bagatelle) for piano in C major (1802)
WoO 55: Prelude for piano in F minor (1803)
WoO 56: Allegretto (Bagatelle) for piano in C major (1803)
WoO 57: Andante favori – original middle movement from Piano Sonata No. 21 (Waldstein) (1805)
WoO 58: Cadenzas for 1st and 3rd movements of Mozart's D minor Piano Concerto (K. 466) (1809)
WoO 59: Poco moto (Bagatelle) for piano in A minor ("Für Elise") (c. 1810)
WoO 60: Ziemlich lebhaft (Bagatelle) for piano in B major (1818))
WoO 61: Allegretto for piano in B minor (1821)
WoO 61a: Allegretto quasi andante for piano in G minor (1825)
WoO 62: String Quintet in C major (fragment, piano transcription)

Variations
WoO 63: Nine variations for piano on a march by Ernst Christoph Dressler (1782)
WoO 64: Six Variations on a Swiss song for piano or harp (1790–1792)
WoO 65: Twenty-four variations for piano on Vincenzo Righini's aria "Venni Amore" (1790–1791)
WoO 66: Thirteen variations for piano on the aria "Es war einmal ein alter Mann" from Carl Ditters von Dittersdorf's opera Das rote Käppchen (1792)
WoO 67: Eight variations for piano four hands on a theme by Count Waldstein (1792)
WoO 68: Twelve variations for piano on the "Menuet a la Vigano" from Jakob Haibel's ballet Le nozze disturbate (1795)
WoO 69: Nine variations for piano on "Quant'e piu bello" from Giovanni Paisiello's opera La Molinara (1795)
WoO 70: Six variations for piano on "Nel cor più non mi sento" from Giovanni Paisiello's opera La Molinara (1795)
WoO 71: Twelve variations for piano on the Russian dance from Paul Wranitzky's ballet Das Waldmädchen (1796–1797)
WoO 72: Eight variations for piano on "Une Fièvre Brûlante" from André Ernest Modeste Grétry's opera Richard Coeur-de-lion (1795)
WoO 73: Ten variations for piano on "La stessa, la stessissima" from Antonio Salieri's opera Falstaff (1799)
WoO 74: "Ich denke dein" – song with six variations for piano four hands (1799)
WoO 75: Seven variations for piano on "Kind, willst du ruhig schlafen" from Peter Winter's opera Das unterbrochene Opferfest (1799)
WoO 76: Eight variations for piano on "Tändeln und scherzen" from Franz Xaver Süssmayr's opera Soliman II (1799)
WoO 77: Six easy variations on an original theme for piano (1800)
WoO 78: Seven variations for piano on "God Save the King" (1802–1803)
WoO 79: Five variations for piano on "Rule Britannia!" (1803)
WoO 80: Thirty-two variations on an original theme in C minor for piano (1806)

Dances

WoO 81: Allemande for piano in A major (1793)
WoO 82: Minuet for piano in E major (1803)
WoO 83: Six Écossaises for piano in E major (1806)
WoO 84: Waltz for piano in E major (1824)
WoO 85: Waltz for piano in D major (1825)
WoO 86: Écossaise for piano in E major (1825)

Vocal works: WoO 87–205

Cantatas, choruses and arias with orchestra
WoO 87: Cantata on the Death of Emperor Joseph II (1790)
WoO 88: Cantata on the Accession of Emperor Leopold II (1790)
WoO 89: Aria "Prüfung des Küssens" (1790–92)
WoO 90: Aria "Mit Mädeln sich vertragen" (1790–92)
WoO 91: Two arias for Die Schöne Schusterin (1795–96)
WoO 92: Aria "Primo Amore" (1790–92)
WoO 92a: Aria "No, non turbati" (1802)
WoO 93: Duet "Nei giorni tuoi felici" (1802)
WoO 94: "Germania", aria with chorus in B major (1814)
WoO 95: Chorus for the Congress of Vienna (1815)
WoO 96: Incidental Music to Leonore Prohaska (1815)
WoO 97: "Es ist vollbracht" for Die Ehrenpforten (1815)
WoO 98: "Wo sich die Pulse", chorus for The Consecration of the House (1822)

Works for multiple voices with piano accompaniment, or unaccompanied
WoO 99 – Polyphonic songs (Italian Part-songs)
No. 1 Bei labbri che amore (Hess 211) (old no. 1)
No. 2 Ma tu tremi (Hess 212) (old no. 6)
No. 3 E pur fra le tempeste (Hess 232)
No. 4 Sei mio ben (Hess 231)
No. 5a Giura il nocchier (Hess 227) (old no. 5b)
No. 5b Giura il nocchier (Hess 230)
No. 5c Giura il nocchier (Hess 221) (old no. 5a)
No. 6 Ah rammenta
No. 7 Chi mai di questo core (Hess 214) (old no. 2)
No. 8 Scrivo in te (Hess 215) (old no. 11)
No. 9 Per te d'amico aprile (Hess 216) (old no. 9)
No. 10a Nei campi e nelle selve (Hess 217) (old no. 7a)
No. 10b Nei campi e nelle selve (Hess 220) (old no. 7b)
No. 11a Fra tutte le pene (Hess 208) (old no. 3a)
No. 11b Fra tutte le pene (Hess 225/209) (old no. 3b)
No. 11c Fra tutte le pene (Hess 224/210) (old no. 3c)
No. 12a Salvo tu vuoi lo sposo
No. 12b Salvo tu vuoi lo sposo (Hess 228)
No. 13a Quella cetra ah pur tu sei (Hess 218) (old no. 10b)
No. 13b Quella cetra ah pur tu sei (Hess 219) (old no. 10c)
No. 13c Quella cetra ah pur tu sei (Hess 213) (old no. 10a)
No. 14a Gia la notte savvicina (Hess 223) (old no. 4b)
No. 14b Gia la notte savvicina (Hess 222) (old no. 4a)
No. 15 Silvio amante disperato (lost) (Hess 226) (old no. 12)
WoO 100: Musical joke for three voices "Lob auf den Dicken"
WoO 101: Musical joke for three voices and chorus "Graf, Graf, liebster Graf"
WoO 102: Chorus for male voices "Abschiedsgesang"
WoO 103: Cantata Un lieto Brindisi
WoO 104: "Gesang der Mönche" from Schiller's Wilhelm Tell for three male voices
WoO 105: Song for solo voice, chorus and piano "Hochzeitslied"
WoO 106: Birthday Cantata for Prince Lobkowitz

Lieder and songs for solo voice and piano
WoO 107–151: Forty-five songs

Folksong arrangements for one or more voices, with piano trio accompaniment
WoO 152: Twenty-five Irish folksongs
WoO 153: Twenty Irish folksongs
WoO 154: Twelve Irish folksongs
WoO 155: Twenty-six Welsh folksongs
WoO 156: Twelve Scottish folksongs
WoO 157: Twelve folksongs of various nationalities
WoO 158a: Twenty-three continental folksongs
WoO 158b: Seven British folksongs
WoO 158c: Six assorted folksongs
WoO 158d: "Air Français"

Vocal canons
WoO 159–198: Forty-three Canons

Musical jokes, quips, and dedications
WoO 199: Musical joke "Ich bin der Herr von zu"
WoO 200: Piano Exercise "O Hoffnung!"
WoO 201: Musical joke "Ich bin bereit!"
WoO 202: Riddle canon "Das Schöne zu dem Guten" (first version)
WoO 203: Riddle canon "Das Schöne zu dem Guten" (second version)
WoO 204: Musical joke "Holz, Holz, Geigt die Quartette So" (Spurious, actually composed by Karl Holz)
WoO 205: Ten musical quips (Kinsky's word is "Notenscherze") from Beethoven's letters

Added works: WoO 206–228
The 2014 revision to the Kinsky catalogue, edited by Dorfmüller, Gertsch and Ronge, assigned WoO numbers to a number of works that appear in other listings. 
WoO 206: Oboe Concerto in F major (lost; only incipits and draft of 2nd movement extant)  (Hess 12)
WoO 207: Romance cantabile for soloists and orchestra (Hess 13)
WoO 208: Wind Quintet in E (fragment) (Hess 19)
WoO 209: Minuet in A for string quartet (Hess 33, piano version Hess 88)
WoO 210: Allegretto for string quartet in B minor (Pencarrow Quartet, Gardi 16)
WoO 211: Andante in C major (Biamonti 52)
WoO 212: Anglaise for piano in D major (Hess 61)
WoO 213a: Andante (bagatelle) in D major (Biamonti 283)
WoO 213b: Finale (bagatelle) in G major (Biamonti 282)
WoO 213c: Allegro (bagatelle) in A major (second part of the Allegro in A and A, Biamonti 284)
WoO 213d: Rondo (bagatelle) in A major (Biamonti 275)
WoO 214: Allegretto (bagatelle) in C minor (Hess 69)
WoO 215: Fugue in C major (Hess 64)
WoO 216a: Bagatelle in C major for piano (Hess 73)
WoO 216b: Bagatelle in E major (Hess 74)
WoO 217: Minuet in F major (Biamonti 66)
WoO 218: Minuet in C major (Biamonti 74)

WoO 219: Waltz or Ländler in C minor (Hess 68)
WoO 220: Kriegslied für die verbündeten Heere (lost) (Hess 123)
WoO 221: Canon, Herr Graf (Hess 276)
WoO 222: Canon in A major (Hess 275, Hess 328)
WoO 223: Thut auf (Biamonti 752)
WoO 224: Cacatum non est Pictum (Gardi 9)
WoO 225: Grossen Dank für solche Gnade (Hess 303)
WoO 226: Fettlümerl und Bankert haben triumphirt (Hess 260)
WoO 227: Musical joke "Esel aller Esel" (Hess 277)
WoO 228a: Musical joke "Ah, Tobias" (Gardi 14)
WoO 228b: Musical joke "Tobias" (Hess 285)

Works with Anhang (Anh.) and Unvollendete (Unv.) numbers
These are works from the Appendix (Anhang in German) of Kinsky's catalog that were attributed to Beethoven at the time the catalog was compiled, but might not have been written by him. The 2014 revision to the Kinsky catalogue, edited by Dorfmüller, Gertsch and Ronge also introduced the category of Unvollendete (unfinished works), for several works that had previously appeared in other listings.
Anh. 1: Symphony in C major ("Jena Symphony") (spurious, actually composed by Friedrich Witt)
Anh. 2: Six string quartets (doubtful)
Anh. 3: Piano trio in D major (spurious, actually composed by Beethoven's brother Karl)
Anh. 4: Sonata for piano and flute in B major (not certain)
Anh. 5: Two piano sonatinas (probably spurious)
Sonatina in G major
Sonatina in F major
Anh. 6: Rondo for piano in B major (spurious, actually composed by Beethoven's brother Karl)
Anh. 7: Piano concerto (Allegro) in D major (first movement) (probably by Johann Joseph Rösler)
Anh. 8: Three pieces for piano four-hands (spurious, actually composed by Leopold Anton Koželuch)
Anh. 9: Nine German dances for piano four-hands (probably doubtful)
Anh. 10: Eight variations on the song "Ich hab'ein kleines Hüttchen nur" for piano in B major (doubtful)
Anh. 11: "Alexandermarsch" for Louis Duport ballet "Der blode Ritter" march for piano in F major (probably doubtful)
Anh. 12: "Pariser Einzugsmarsch" march for piano in C major (spurious, actually composed by Johann Heinrich Walch)
Anh. 13: Funeral march for piano in F minor (spurious, actually composed by Johann Heinrich Walch, but still popularly called "Beethoven's Funeral March" in the UK; where it is famously played during the Remembrance Sunday service at the Cenotaph)
Anh. 14: Six piano waltzes (probably spurious)
Anh. 15: "Glaube, Liebe, und Hoffnung" waltz for piano in F major, most known as "Adieu to the piano" (probably doubtful)
Anh. 16: Four piano waltzes
"Jubelwalzer" waltz for piano in C major (probably doubtful)
"Gertruds Traumwalzer" waltz for piano in B major, most known as "Gertrude's Dream Waltz" (spurious, author unknown)
"Sonnenscheinwalzer" waltz for piano in E major (probably doubtful)
"Mondscheinwalzer" waltz for piano in A major (probably doubtful)
Anh. 17: "Introduction and Waltz (Klavierstück)" waltz for piano in F major (probably doubtful)
Anh. 18: "An Sie" or "Nachruf" song in A major (Voice and Piano or Guitar) (probably doubtful)
Unv. 1 Symphony in C minor = Hess 298
Unv. 2 Sketches for a symphony in C (parts of which were reused for Symphony #1) = Biamonti 73
Unv. 3 Symphony No. 10 = Biamonti 838
Unv. 4 Sketches for a BACH Overture = Biamonti 832
Unv. 5 Concertante in D = Gardi 3
Unv. 6 Piano Concerto #6 in D = Hess 15
Unv. 7 String Quintet movement in D minor = Hess 40
Unv. 8 Duo for Violin and Cello in E-flat = Gardi 2
Unv. 9 Allegretto in E-flat for Piano Trio = Hess 48
Unv. 10 Piano Trio in F minor = Biamonti 637
Unv. 11 Violin Sonata in A = Hess 46
Unv. 12 Fantasia/Piano Sonata in D = Biamonti 213
Unv. 13 Piano Sonata in E-flat (found at Fischhof 42v, previously uncatalogued)
Unv. 14 Variations for Piano in A (found at Fischhof 25v through 26v, previously uncatalogued)
Unv. 15 Opera, Vestas Feuer = Hess 115
Unv. 16 Opera, Macbeth = Biamonti 454 (Beethoven is believed to have intended to write the opera Macbeth; a performing version of possible sketches was assembled by Albert Willem Holsbergen between 1999 and 2001. The premiere performance of the Beethoven Macbeth Overture was by the National Symphony Orchestra on September 20–22, 2001, under the direction of Leonard Slatkin).
Unv. 17 Cantata, Europens Befreiungsstunde = Hess 317
Unv. 18 Östreich über alles, Song for Chorus and Orchestra, Biamonti 477
Unv. 19 Cantata for voice and piano in B-flat, (found in Fischhof f.1v, Kafka f.100r and a.66 f.1r. previously uncatalogued)
Unv. 20 Lamentations of Jeremiah = Gardi 4
Unv. 21 Song, "Traute Henriette" = Hess 151
Unv. 22 Song, "Rastlose Liebe" = Hess 149
Unv. 23 Song, "Heidenröslein" = Hess 150

Works with Hess numbers

Works with Hess number
These works have numbers that were assigned by Willy Hess in his catalogue of Beethoven's works. Many of the works in the Hess catalog also have WoO or Unv. numbers; those entries are not listed here.
Hess 1: Original ending to first movement of Symphony No. 8 (1812)
Hess 3: Twelve Ecossaise for piano or orchestra
Hess 11: Romance No. 3 for violin & orchestra (1816)
Hess 14: Fragment of original version of Piano Concerto No. 2 (1794–95)
Hess 16: Original introduction to the Choral Fantasy (1808)
Hess 25: String Trio Opus 3 (first version) (1793)
Hess 28: Movement in A major for string trio Opus 9 No. 1 (second trio to the Scherzo) (1797)
Hess 29–31: Preludes and Fugues for Albrechtsberger (1794–95)
Hess 32: String Quartet in F major (first version of Opus 18 No. 1) (1799)
Hess 34: String Quartet in F major (arrangement of Opus 14 No. 1) (1801–02)
Hess 35: Bach fugue arranged for string quartet (fragment) (1817)
Hess 36: Handel fugue arranged for string quartet (1798)
Hess 37: Mozart fugue arranged for piano four hands

Hess 38: Bach fugue arranged for string quintet (1801–02)
Hess 39: String Quintet in F major (lost)
Hess 40: Prelude for String Quintet (incomplete) (1817)
Hess 44: Adagio ma non troppo for mandolin & harpsichord in E major
Hess 46: Violin Sonata in A major (fragment) (c.1790)
Hess 47: Allegro con brio in E major for piano trio (arrangement of String Trio Opus 3)
Hess 49: Piano Trio in E major (1786)
Hess 50: Piano Trio in B major (1786)
Hess 52: Piano Sonata in C major
Hess 54: Piano variations on Freudvoll und Liedvoll
Hess 57: Bagatelle in C major (1824)
Hess 58: Piano Exercise in B major (1800)
Hess 59: Piano Exercise in C (1792–1800)
Hess 60: Draft in A for Piano (1793)
Hess 63: Arrangement of Christian Friedrich Daniel Schubart's "Kaplied" for piano (1789)
Hess 65: Concerto excerpt (arrangement of Opus 37) (1820–01)
Hess 66: Allegretto in C minor (1796–97)
Hess 67: Two German dances for piano (1811)
Hess 69: Allegretto for piano in C minor (1794)
Hess 70: Adagio for piano in G major (1803–04)
Hess 71: Molto adagio for piano in G major (1803–04)
Hess 72: Variations for piano in A major (1803)
Hess 76–83: Cadenzas for Piano
Hess 84: Rondo for piano
Hess 85: Piano cadenza for Op. 61a
Hess 87: Grenadiermarsch for piano (arrangement of WoO 29) (1797–98)
Hess 88: Minuet for piano (arrangement of WoO 209) (1790–92)
Hess 89: Ritterballet for piano (arrangement of WoO 1) (1791)
Hess 90: The Creatures of Prometheus for piano (arrangement of Op. 43) (1801)
Hess 91–5: Five Songs
Hess 96: Fragment of Symphony No. 7 for piano (1813)
Hess 97: Wellington's Victory for piano and two cannons (arrangement of Op. 91) (1816)
Hess 98: Scherzo for piano (1794–99)
Hess 99: Yorckscher Marsch (piano arrangement of WoO 18) (1809–10)
Hess 100: Twelve German dances (piano arrangement of WoO 8) (1795)
Hess 101: Twelve Minuets (piano arrangement of WoO 7) (1795)
Hess 102: Nine contredanses (piano arrangement of nos. 1-2, 4-5, 7-10, 12 from Twelve contredanses for orchestra WoO 14) (1791–1801)
Hess 107: Grenadiermarsch (musical clock arrangement of WoO 29) (1798)
Hess 108: Wellington's Victory (panharmonicon arrangement of the second part of Opus 91) (1813)
Hess 110–114: Parts from 'Leonore
Hess 116: Fragment for Solo Voice(s): "Ritterblatt"
Hess 118: Music for The Consecration of the House (from Opus 113) (1822)
Hess 121–122: Arias from Leonore
Hess 123–1247: Songs
Hess 152–207: Folksong settings
Hess 208–232: Italian partsongs
Hess 233–246: Counterpoint exercises
Hess 254: Canon in G major: "Hol dich der Teufel" (1801)
Hess 263–264: Two canons
Hess 274: Canons in G major (1803)
Hess 296: Little Cadenza for Instrument(s) (1822)
Hess 297: Adagio for three horns (1815)
Hess 299–305: Sketches for canons
Hess 306–309: Four canons
Hess 310: Prelude in C for Organ
Hess 311–312: Two canons
Hess 313: Song: "Te solo adoro" (1824)
Hess 314: Funeral Cantata (1781)
Hess 315: Fugue
Hess 316: Quintet (1793)
Hess 318–319: String Quintets
Hess 320: Andante for String Quartet in G major (1815)
Hess 321–324: Melodies
Hess 325: Piece for piano in D major (1802)
Hess 326: Fugue for piano in C major (1800–01)
Hess 327: Two little melodies (1803)
Hess 329–330: Sketches
Hess 331: Minuet for piano in B  major
Hess 332: Pastorella for String Quartet in D major (1799)
Hess 333: Minuet-Scherzo for String Quartet in A major	(1799)
Hess 334: Draft for String Quartet in A major (1799)
Hess 335: Two exercises on the song "Gedenke Mein"

Works with Hess Anhang (Anh.) numbers
These are works included in the appendix of Hess's catalogue that might not be genuine works by Beethoven.
Anh. 3: Marches zur großen Wachtparade (not certain)
Anh. 4: Marsch in geschwinden tempo (not certain)
Anh. 5: Twelve waltzes for 2 Violins and Bass, with 2 Flutes and 2 Horns ad libitum (not certain) (1807)
Anh. 8: Quintet for Flute, Violin, 2 Violas, and Cello (not certain)
Anh. 9: Sonata for Violins and Cello (not certain)
Anh. 10: Andante favori for string quartet (arrangement of WoO 57) (not certain)
Anh. 17: Adagio and Andante for violin and piano (not certain)
Anh. 21: Bagatelle "An Laura" for piano (arrangement of WoO 112) (doubtful)
Anh. 22: Funeral March in C Minor (not certain)
Anh. 38–56: Songs (not certain)
Anh. 57: Fugue "Dona nobis pacem" (now thought genuine) (1795)
Anh. 58: Bundeslied (not certain)
Anh. 59: Folksong "As I was wandering" (not certain)
Anh. 60: Canon in C major (probably spurious)
Anh. 61–62: Canons (spurious)
Anh. 63–64: Canons (not certain)
Anh. 65: Cantata Karfreitagskantate (not certain)
Anh. 66: Two fragments for chorus (not certain)

Works with Biamonti numbers
The Italian musicologist Giovanni Biamonti compiled a chronological catalogue Beethoven's entire output known at the time, including sketches and fragments. While most of these works were already included in other catalogues, there were some that had been missed by earlier compilers. This list does not include works with opus, WoO or Hess numbers, nor does it include sketches.
Bia 15: Song "Der Arme Componist" (1788–91)
Bia 16: Cello part to the Lost Cadenza for Leopold Cantata WoO 88
Bia 43: Song "Meine Mutter fragt mich immer: trinkst du?"
Bia 48: Anglaise for piano for G minor (1792)
Bia 238: Presto in F major (1800)
Bia 249: Minuet for orchestra in D major (1800)
Bia 252: Minuet for orchestra in D major (1800)
Bia 269: Andante molto for piano in E major
Bia 272: Andante for piano in B major (1793)
Bia 274: Andante for String Quartet in C major (1793)
Bia 277: Presto for piano in G major (1793)
Bia 279: Allegro for piano in C major (1793)
Bia 291: Andante, for a symphony (1801)
Bia 292: March with variations (1801)
Bia 319: Finale for piano (1802)
Bia 322: Piece for piano in C minor (1802)
Bia 323: Piece for piano (1802)
Bia 346: Fuga Antique for piano in C major (1803)
Bia 347: Passage for piano through all the keys (1803)
Bia 359: Rondo for "all the instruments" (1803)
Bia 380: Song "Zur Erde sank die Ruh' vom Himmel nieder" (1803)
Bia 383: Exercise for piano
Bia 389: Piece for viola, cello, horn and double bass (1803)
Bia 392: Rondo for piano (1803)
Bia 447: Passage for piano (1808)
Bia 547: Symphony No. 8 with the original ending of Hess 1 (1812)
Bia 606: Andante for pizzicati basses with clarinets in B minor (1815)
Bia 621: Allemande for piano (1815)
Bia 622: Pastorella for piano in C major (1815)
Bia 624: Etude, study of prosody on a text of Homer (1815)
Bia 632: Song "Die Zufrieddenheit" (1815)
Bia 634: German dance for piano trio in F minor (1815)
Bia 638: Exercise for piano (1815)
Bia 797: Adagio for String Quartet in E major (1824)
Bia 811: Canon in C minor (1825)
Bia 849: Draft for piano (last notes written by Beethoven) (1827)

There were also several projected works by Beethoven, including the operas Alessandro, Memnons Dreiklang, and Bradamante; an oratorio on a text by Meissner, an oratorio "Die Befrieung Jerusalems", and an oratorio "Die Sündflut" with text by Hammer-Purgstall.

See also

 Symphony No. 10 (Beethoven/Cooper) (hypothetical)

References

Notes

Sources

Catalogues and bibliographies
Biamonti, Giovanni. Catologo cronologo e tematico delle opere di Beethoven. Torino: ILTE, 1968. —Encompasses works with and without opus numbers, as well as sketches and fragments, in 849 chronologically arranged entries.
Bruers, Antonio. Beethoven: Catalogo Storico-Critico di Tutte le Opere. Rome: G. Bardi, 1951. 
Dorfmüller, Kurt (ed). Beiträge zur Beethoven-Bibliographie: Studien und Materialen zum Werkverzeichnis von Kinsky-Halm. München: G. Henle, 1978 
Dorfmüller, Kurt, Gertsch, Norbert and Ronge, Julia. Ludwig van Beethoven Thematisch-bibliographisches Werkverzeichnis. München: G. Henle, 2014. .—Revised and expanded edition of the catalogue of works by Kinsky and Halm.
Green, James (ed. and trans). The New Hess Catalog of Beethoven's Works. West Newbury, Vermont: Vance Brook, 2003. .—An English translation of Willy Hess' important 1957 catalogue and study, updated to reflect more recent scholarship.
Haas, Wilhelm. Systematische Ordnung Beethovenscher Melodien. Leipzig: Quelle & Meyer, 1932. 
Hess, Willy. Verzeichnis der nicht in der Gesamtausgabe veröffentlichen Werke Ludwig van Beethovens. Wiesbaden: Breitkopf & Härtel, 1957. —Hess' original study and catalogue; still more widely available in libraries than Green's edition.
Johnson, Douglas, Tyson, Alan and Winter, Robert. The Beethoven Sketchbooks: History, Reconstruction, Inventory. Berkeley : University of California Press, 1985. 
Johnson, Douglas and Burnham, Scott G. "Beethoven, Ludwig Van (Works)", Grove Music Online ed. L. Macy (Subscription access). Accessed 19 April 2007.—Includes categorized works list with bibliographical and other information.
Kastner, Emerich and Frimmel, Theodor von. Bibliotheca Beethoveniana. Leipzig: Breitkopf & Härtel, 1925. 
Kinsky, Georg and Halm, Hanss. Das Werk Beethovens: thematisch-bibliographisches Verzeichnis seiner sämtlichen vollendeten Kompositionen. München: G. Henle, 1955. —The standard thematic and bibliographical catalogue of Beethoven's works.
Nottebohm, Gustav. Thematisches Verzeichnis der im Druck erschienenen Werke von Ludwig van Beethoven. Leipzig, Breitkopf & Härtel, 1925 . Reprinted Wiesbaden: M. Sändig, 1969 .—Historically important thematic catalogue, by a pioneering 19th Century Beethoven scholar.
Schürmann, Kurt E. Ludwig van Beethoven: alle vertonten und musikalisch bearbeiteten Texte. Münster : Aschendorff, 1980. 
Solomon, Maynard. Beethoven (1st edition). New York: Schirmer, 1977. . pp. 372, 386–391.—Popular biographical study; includes bibliographical notes and (incomplete) works lists.
Thayer, Alexander Wheelock. Chronologisches Verzeichniss der Werke Ludwig van Beethovens. Berlin: Ferdinand Schneider, 1865. 
Tyson, Alan. The Authentic English Editions of Beethoven. London: Faber & Faber, 1963.

Works collections (scores)
Ludwig van Beethovens Werke: Vollständige kritisch durchgesehene überall berechtigte Ausgabe. Leipzig: Breitkopf & Härtel,vols i–xxiv, 1862–65; vol xxv (supplement), 1888. —Original critical "complete works" edition, commonly known as the Beethoven Gesamtausgabe.
Beethoven: Sämtliche Werke: Supplemente zur Gesamtausgabe, ed. W. Hess. Wiesbaden: Breitkopf & Härtel, 1959. —Hess's supplement to the 19th century Breitkopf edition.
Beethovens Werke: neue Ausgabe sämtlicher Werke, edited by Joseph Schmidt-Görg, Martin Staehelin, et al. München: G. Henle, 1961 – (current). – New critical edition, "herausgaben vom Beethoven-Archiv, Bonn"; 56 volumes in 13 categories, 36 volumes released  as of January 2009.

Books
Cooper, Barry (ed). Beethoven Compendium: a Guide to Beethoven's Life and Music. New York: Thames and Hudson, 1991. 
Cooper, Barry. The Creation of Beethoven's 35 Piano Sonatas. Oxford: Routledge, 2017.

External links

Opus numbers, Kinsky, Hess and Biamonti catalogue from lvbeethoven.com – includes dedicatees, librettists, and other information, as well as sound files.

"Beethoven, Ludwig van" in Oxford Music Online (by subscription)
Works Index
Catalogue 

 
Beethoven